Channarayapatna  is a town and Taluk headquarters in Hassan district of Karnataka, India. It lies on the Bangalore-Mangalore National Highway 75 in Karnataka, India.It has number of temples like Channakeshava temple, Anjaneya temple, Tejigereyamma temple... etc. Famous Jain pilgrimage Shravanabelagola belongs to this taluk. Channarayapatna has major railway connection from Bengaluru to Mangaluru, Karwar and Mysuru.

Taluk
Channarayapatna Taluk is one of the eight taluks in Hassan district of Karnataka state. There are 40 ಕಠಖpanchayat villages in Channarayapatna Taluk, for 407 villages.

Geography 
It has an average elevation of 827 metres (2716 ft).

Located within Channarayapatna is Bagur Navile Tunnel, the longest water tunnel in India.

Demographics
As of 2011 India census, Channarayapatna has a population of 279,798. Males constitute 51% of the population and females 49%. Channarayapatna has an average literacy rate of 73%, higher than the national average of 59.5%; with male literacy of 78% and female literacy of 68%. 11% of the population is under 6 years of age.

Economy 
Agriculture is the major economic activity. Sugarcane & Coconut are the leading commercial crops, while food crops include Ragi, Potato, Sunflower, and Paddy.  The taluk also has mineral reserves, such as chromite.

Gallery

People from Channarayapatna
 H. C. Srikantaiah, Former Minister and Member of Parliament 
 Dr. N B Nanjappa, Former Member of the legislative assembly
 S. L. Bhyrappa, novelist and professor
 Nanditha, playback singer
 C. N. Manjunath, cardiologist
 Nagaraj Kote, actor in Kannada Movies

See also
 Shravanabelagola
 Shravaneri
 Arsikere
 Gandasi Handpost

References

External links
 

Cities and towns in Hassan district